José dos Santos Ferreira, better known as Adé (28 July 1919, in Portuguese Macau – 24 March 1993, in Hong Kong), was a Hong Kong poet. He was a son of Portuguese father and a Cantonese mother. He was the last poet of distinction to write in Macanese (Patuá), the Portuguese-Cantonese creole.

Adé lived all his life in Macau and left behind a great body of work consisting of 18 books of poetry, prose, plays, operettas, and radio shows in Patua. Adé wrote, directed, and acted in his own productions.

Partial bibliography
 Escandinávia, Região de Encantos Mil (1960).
 Macau sa Assi (in patois) (1968).
 Qui-nova chencho.  Macau: Tipografia da Missão do Padroado (1974).
 Papiá cristá di Macau: Epitome de gramática comparada e vocabulário : dialecto macaense.  Macau: [s.n.] (1978).
 Bilhar e Caridade (poetry) (1982)
 Macau di tempo antigo: Poesia e prosa:  dialecto macaense.  Macau: author's edition (1985).
 Poéma di Macau (poetry, em patois)(1983)
 'Nhum Vêlo' (in patois) (1986)
 Poéma na língu maquista (Poesia em papel-de-arroz).  Macau:  Livros do Oriente (1992).  

1919 births
1993 deaths
Culture of Macau
Macanese people
Macau people of Portuguese descent
Hong Kong poets
Portuguese male poets
20th-century Portuguese poets

Hong Kong people of Portuguese descent